Leah Pipes (born August 12, 1988) is an American actress. She starred in the television series Life Is Wild, the slasher film Sorority Row and the CW's The Originals.

Early life
Pipes was born in Los Angeles, California.

Career
She broke into screen acting in 2001 on the supernatural-drama series show Angel. She was a regular on the TV series Lost at Home and appeared in the Disney Channel Original Movie Pixel Perfect as Samantha Jacobs. She starred in the movie Fingerprints in 2006 (released in 2008). She has also appeared on TV shows such as Crossing Jordan and Drake & Josh. She also appeared on Clubhouse as Jessie.

She starred in the soccer film Her Best Move. She appeared in Odd Girl Out and other small budget films. In 2006 Pipes starred as the teenage foster child Kelly in an episode of Fox's TV series Bones.

For the 2007–2008 television season, Pipes starred in the drama series Life Is Wild.
She also had a recurring role in Terminator: The Sarah Connor Chronicles as Jody. She plays Beth in the ABC series The Deep End, which premiered on 21 January 2010.

She played one of the leads in her first major film, 2009's Sorority Row.

In 2010, she played Miranda for one episode of Law & Order: Los Angeles. She also played Alexis for one episode of The Defenders. In 2012, she began filming alongside Mischa Barton and Ryan Eggold in the Mark Edwin Robinson's supernatural romance thriller, Into the Dark.

In 2013, she played Katie in Jodi Arias: Dirty Little Secret, a television movie about  the murder of Travis Alexander.

She starred with E.J. Bonilla in the film romance Musical Chairs, about a couple who participates in wheelchair ballroom dancing. It was released theatrically on March 23, 2012. Pipes starred in The Originals as Camille O'Connell. She also starred in Charmed as Fiona a witch whose magic equals  with the powers of the charmed ones.

Personal life
In January 2014, Pipes announced her engagement to actor and musician A.J. Trauth, after almost three years of dating. They married on December 6, 2014 in Santa Barbara, California. Pipes filed for divorce in May 2019.

She is currently dating artist Mav Viola.

Filmography

Film

Television

Music videos

Awards

References

External links 
 

1988 births
Actresses from Los Angeles
American child actresses
American film actresses
American television actresses
Living people
21st-century American actresses